Commission v Germany (1987) Case 178/84 is an EU law case, concerning the free movement of goods in the European Union.

Facts
The Biersteuergesetz (Beer Tax Act, often referred to as the Reinheitsgebot or Beer Purity Law) originally from 1516, banned marketing of beer with any additives. It also reserved the name ‘Bier’ for malted barley, hops, yeast and water only. Maize and rice being used meant the product could not be called ‘Bier’. French brewers claimed the restrictions were protectionist to exclude imported beer. Germany argued that Germans drank a lot of beer, and long term effects of additives were unknown. Consumers were used to linking the word ‘Bier’ only to those products with the traditional ingredients.

Judgment
ECJ held the rule could not be justified. It examined international scientific research and the EU’s scientific committee for food work, the codex alimentarius of the UN and the WHO and found that additives posed no risk to public health. Germany permitted additives in drinks other than beer, so its policy was inconsistent. TFEU art 110 case law was similar.

See also

European Union law

Notes

References
I Murray, ‘German beer law repealed’ (2 June 1990) The Times, the Biersteuergesetz was repealed so that beers from other MSs can be sold in Germany, so long as other ingredients are clearly marked. 
HC Heyebrand (1991) 16 ELR 391, argues the court emphasises labelling too much, and that it does not adequately inform consumers.

European Union goods case law
1987 in case law
Alcohol law in Germany
German beer culture
France–Germany relations
1987 in Germany